Daniel Sancery (born 27 May 1994), is a Brazilian rugby union player currently contracted to French team SC Graulhet. He mostly plays as a wing, but can also play full-back.

Career

Domestic
He joined French team SC Albi from UA Gaillac. During the 2014–15 season, he was the top scorer in SC Albi's reserve team with 16 tries, and made his Rugby Pro D2 debut for the full team in the first half of the 2015–16 season, starting on the left wing in a 27-9 away defeat by Mont-de-Marsan on 30 October 2015. He received his opportunity as SC Albi's regular winger Maxime Le Bourhis missed the match to be at the bedside of his wife, who was about to give birth.

International
On 2 February 2016, he was named by head coach Rodolfo Ambrosio in Brazil's 31-man squad for the inaugural Americas Rugby Championship.

He made his international debut for Brazil in the first match of the 2016 championship away against Chile in Santiago. The match was the very first in the new competition and, playing at full-back, he scored the ARC's first ever try in the seventh minute. His twin brother Felipe also scored later in the match for Brazil, but they lost 25-22.

He scored tries in each of his first four international appearances for Brazil, away against Chile, home (Barueri) against Uruguay, away (Langford) against Canada, and at home (Barueri) in the 24-23 win over the United States.

The Americas Rugby News website named him at full-back in its 2016 Americas Rugby Championship Dream Team. He was the only Brazil player selected.

References

External links
 
 

1994 births
Living people
Brazilian rugby union players
Rugby union wings
Rugby union fullbacks
Olympic rugby sevens players of Brazil
Brazil international rugby sevens players
Rugby sevens players at the 2016 Summer Olympics
Rugby sevens players at the 2019 Pan American Games
Pan American Games competitors for Brazil
Cobras Brasil XV players
SC Albi players
Sporting Club Graulhetois players
Brazilian rugby sevens players
Brazil international rugby union players
Brazilian expatriate sportspeople in France
Brazilian expatriate rugby union players
Expatriate rugby union players in France
Brazilian twins
Twin sportspeople
Brazilian people of French descent